KCWT, UHF analog channel 27, was a religious television station licensed to Wenatchee, Washington, United States.

History

KCWT went on the air as an independent station in 1984 as the "First Television Station in North Central Washington", airing a mix of off-network sitcoms, movies, dramas, and classic cartoons. A newscast was added at 5 and 10 pm weeknights to compete with the stations in Seattle and Spokane, to better reflect the views of the Wenatchee area that felt neglected by the two larger markets. They also carried a weeknight Bingo game to get people to tune to the station.

In the fall of 1984, the station started running a 1-hour anime block in the afternoons. A year later, they briefly found success when it became one of the first stations in the United States to air the Robotech saga. The show was so popular, that when it was pulled from the schedule after its initial run, a letter writing campaign began to bring it back. They reran it for another year.

KCWT became a satellite of KAYU in 1986, mostly simulcasting its entire schedule. Along with the Fox affiliation and new branding as "Fox 27", the quality of programming improved, with first-run syndicated shows as the Disney Afternoon block and Star Trek: The Next Generation.

In 1989, KCWT dropped its Fox affiliation (which later moved to K53CY), and became an independent once again, filling out their programming schedule from the Channel America service. A year later, after new ownership took over, the station became an affiliate of Trinity Broadcasting Network.

In 1993, KCWT was forced off the air after its transmitter (located at Mission Ridge) malfunctioned. It was never repaired. (Its cable channel slot, which varied on TCI systems in the region, was later occupied by the then-new premium channel Starz!-Encore 8 in 1994.)
   
By then the station ceased operations and returned its license back to the FCC. Metropolitan Wenatchee became part of the Seattle DMA afterward.

KCWT's offices (which were located at 32 B North Mission Street, above KPQ-AM and FM) later housed Columbia River Broadcasting's radio cluster of KYVF (later KKXA, now KWLN), KSSY (now KKRV) and KKRT until they relocated in 2008, after KPQ's acquisition by Cherry Creek Radio. The building is now owned by Icicle River Broadcasting, owners of KOHO and KZAL.

Defunct television stations in the United States
Television channels and stations established in 1984
Television channels and stations disestablished in 1993
1984 establishments in Washington (state)
1993 disestablishments in Washington (state)
CWT